The Indian Institute of Remote Sensing is a premier institute for research, higher education and training in the field of remote sensing, geoinformatics and GPS technology for natural resources, environmental and disaster management under the Indian Department of Space, which was established in the year 1966. It is located in the city of Dehradun, Uttarakhand.

History
Formerly known as Indian Photo-interpretation Institute (IPI), the institute was founded on 21 April 1966 under the aegis of Survey of India (SOI). It was established with the collaboration of the government of the Netherlands on the pattern of the Faculty of Geo-Information Science and Earth Observation (ITC) of the University of Twente, formerly known as the International Institute for Aerospace Survey and Earth Sciences. The original idea of setting the institute came from India's first prime minister, Pandit Jawahar Lal Nehru, during his visit to the Netherlands in 1957.

The institute's building at Kalidas Road, Dehradun was inaugurated on 27 May 1972. Since its founding, the institute has been playing a key role in capacity building in remote sensing and geoinformatics technology and their applications for the benefit of the user community from India and abroad. Today, it has programmes for all levels of users, i.e. mid-career professionals, researchers, academia, fresh graduates and policy makers.

NRSA converted into a government entity under DOS/ISRO
NRSA is closely associated with various programmes of the Department of Space (DOS)/Indian Space Research Organisation (ISRO), in particular, the Earth Observation Programme, Disaster Management Support and other programmes of national importance. To enable NRSA to carry out its responsibilities in a more effective manner, the Government has after careful consideration, decided to convert it into a Government entity, to be called a National Remote Sensing Centre (NRSC), a Centre under DOS/ISRO, effective 1 September 2008.

Reorganisation of the IIRS as independent unit of ISRO
Indian Institute of Remote Sensing, Dehradun has been premier institute responsible for capacity building in the field of Remote Sensing and GIS applications. It has grown manifolds and establish itself as an institute of repute both nationally and internationally. Realising the potential of Earth Observation System and ISRO's forthcoming initiatives in the areas of Natural Resource Survey, Earth and Atmospheric Sciences and Oceanography, Dr. K. Radhakrishnan, Chairman ISRO has reorganised IIRS as a separate entity of ISRO w.e.f. 30 April 2011. IIRS will continue its Training, Education and Research programmes with enhanced focus on Microwave Remote Sensing, Hyperspectral Remote Sensing and Climate studies.

The institute will be guided by a Management Council which will provide overall direction for the development of the institute. Dr. P.S. Roy, Outstanding Scientist has been appointed as first Director of IIRS w.e.f 30 April 2011.

Courses
The focus of the IIRS is training and education in the field of geoinformatics. Technology and applications of Remote Sensing, GIS and GPS are taught in the form of training and education.

Educational courses 
M. Tech in Remote Sensing and GIS in Natural Resource Management, affiliated to
Andhra University, in one of the following optional streams
 Agriculture and Soils
 Forestry and Ecology
 Geosciences
 Marine  and Atmospheric Sciences
 Human Settlement Analysis
 Water Resources
 Satellite Image Analysis & Photogrammetry
 Geoinformatics
Master's in Science, awarded by ITC, Netherlands in
 Geoinformatics
 Geo Hazards

Training coursesPost Graduate Diploma (10-month) in Agriculture and Soils
 Forestry and Ecology
 Geosciences
 Marine Sciences
 Human Settlement Analysis
 Water Resources
 Digital Photogrammetry
 Geoinformatics
 Geo HazardsCertificate courses (4-month)'''
 Basic Photogrammetry and Remote Sensing
 GIS in Geosciences
 Land Information System
 GIS in Soils and Land Use Planning
 GIS in Water Resources Management
 GIS in Coastal Zone Management
 GIS in Forest Management
 Geo-Hazards

Training opportunities for special groups
 Special Course
 Orientation Course in any area of Natural Resource Management,
Environmental Assessment and Disaster Management
 Awareness course/workshop on Geo-Hazards
 Awareness course/workshop on Geo-Hazards
 Overview for decision makers

International programmes
 Short Course on Remote Sensing with special emphasis on Digital Image
Processing (ITEC Sponsored)
 Short Course on Geoinformatics (ITEC Sponsored)

NNRMS/ISRO sponsored courses
The following NNRMS and ISRO-sponsored courses are for university faculty only.
 GIS Technology and Applications
 RS and GIS Applications to Water Resources
 RS and GIS in Forestry/Botany/Ecology/Wildlife/ Environmental Science
 RS and GIS in Urban and Regional Planning
 Cartography and Mapping
 RS and GIS in Geosciences
 RS and GIS in Soils and Land Use Planning

International Collaborations
IIRS has collaborations with many reputed international organisations for capacity building, research and faculty exchange. The organisations with which IIRS has/had significant collaborations are: ITC, IHE (International Institute for Infrastructural, Hydraulic and Environmental Engineering) and Wageningen University in The Netherlands; ITTO (International Timber Research Organisation); UNESCO (United Nations Education & Scientific Cooperation Organisation); WMO (World Meteorological Organisation); ADPC (Asian Disaster Preparedness Centre); and NGI (Norwegian Geological Institute).

References

External links
 Indian Institute Of Remote Sensing 

Remote sensing research institutes
Space programme of India
Indian Space Research Organisation
Research institutes in Dehradun
Universities and colleges in Dehradun
Science and technology in Dehradun
Colleges affiliated to Andhra University
1966 establishments in Uttar Pradesh